Ghadir Razuki is a British-Iraqi businessman who was the founder of TNT Magazine, in September 1983.

Early life
Born to Iraqi parents, he moved to London in the United Kingdom after leaving Iraq.
In September 1983, then aged twenty-two he launched and published TNT Magazine, a travel magazine aimed at Australian, New Zealand and South African expatriates, in an Earls Court Road office.

Career
In 2000, Ghadir sold TNT Magazine to the Trader Media Group, an independent publishing company that would later be subject to hostile takeover by the Guardian newspaper.

Ghadir has since become a Director of A-League football club Melbourne City, formally known as Melbourne Heart.

References 

Living people
Iraqi businesspeople
British businesspeople
British people of Iraqi descent
Year of birth missing (living people)